René Hervil (1881–1960) was a French actor, screenwriter and film director. Most of his films were made during the silent era. He directed the Maud series of films between 1912 and 1915 starring the Anglo-French actress Aimée Campton.

Selected filmography
 Infatuation aka Bouclette (1918)
 In Old Alsace (1920)
 The Gardens of Murcia (1923)
 The Secret of Polichinelle (1923)
 The Flame (1926)
 The Man with the Hispano (1926)
 The Chocolate Girl (1927)
 Prince Jean (1928)
 The Sweetness of Loving (1930)
 The Mystery of the Villa Rose (1930)
 Nicole and Her Virtue (1932)
 Our Lord's Vineyard (1932)
 Un Train dans La Nuit (1934)

References

Bibliography
 Goble, Alan. The Complete Index to Literary Sources in Film. Walter de Gruyter, 1999.

External links

1881 births
1960 deaths
20th-century French screenwriters
French film directors
French male film actors
French male silent film actors
20th-century French male actors
People from Levallois-Perret